Dirk van den Broek (27 March 1924 – 8 April 2020) was a Dutch businessman, founder of Cooperating Dirk van den Broek Companies. Around 2014, all of his stores were renamed just into Dirk.

He was born in Amsterdam in 1924. At the age of 15, he started his own business by selling milk by a cart throughout the city. During 1942, he began a small dairy store.
In 1953, he started the first supermarket in Amsterdam.

Throughout the years his company took over some other grocery stores and he started D-reizen, as travel agent.
At the moment the company is one of the oldest family-owned businesses in the Netherlands.

He ran more than 120 stores, most concentrated at the western part of the country.

Van den Broek was knighted as Officer in the Order of Orange Nassau in 1990 by Queen Beatrix of the Netherlands.

He was married and had five children, all of them are, or have been, active in the family business.

He died in Aerdenhout, at the age of 96.

References

1924 births
2020 deaths
Businesspeople from Amsterdam